The 2012 If Stockholm Open was a professional men's tennis tournament played on indoor hard courts. It was the 44th edition of the tournament, and part of the ATP World Tour 250 series of the 2012 ATP World Tour. It took place at the Kungliga tennishallen in Stockholm, Sweden between 15 and 21 October 2012. Tomáš Berdych won the singles title.

Finals

Singles

 Tomáš Berdych defeated  Jo-Wilfried Tsonga, 4–6, 6–4, 6–4

Doubles

 Marcelo Melo /  Bruno Soares defeated  Robert Lindstedt /  Nenad Zimonjić, 6–7(7–4), 6–4, [10–6]

Singles main-draw entrants

Seeds

 1 Rankings are as of October 8, 2012

Other entrants
The following players received wildcards into the singles main draw:
  Nicolás Almagro
  Lleyton Hewitt
  Patrik Rosenholm

The following players received entry from the qualifying draw:
  Marius Copil
  Federico Delbonis
  Yannick Mertens
  Maxime Teixeira

Retirements
  Marcos Baghdatis (left groin injury)
  Alejandro Falla

Doubles main-draw entrants

Seeds

 Rankings are as of October 8, 2012

Other entrants
The following pairs received wildcards into the doubles main draw:
  Filip Bergevi /  Fred Simonsson
  Brian Baker /  Andreas Siljeström
The following pair received entry as alternates:
  Patrik Rosenholm /  Milos Sekulic

Withdrawals
  Gaël Monfils (right knee injury)

Retirements
  Marcos Baghdatis (neck pain)

References

External links
 Official website 

 
Stockholm Open
Stockholm Open